Dennis Banton (30 March 1930 – 23 June 2010) was an English cricketer.  Banton was a right-handed batsman who bowled both right-arm off break and right-arm medium pace.  He was born in Nottingham, Nottinghamshire and known by his nickname Joe.

Banton made his debut for Oxfordshire in the 1950 Minor Counties Championship against Devon.  Banton played Minor counties cricket for Oxfordshire from 1950 to 1973 which included 177 Minor Counties Championship matches.  He scored 5,092 runs at an average of 21.49, while with the ball he took 571 wickets for the county in Minor counties cricket.  An able fielder, he took 134 catches.  He made his List A debut against Cambridgeshire in the 1967 Gillette Cup.  He played 2 further List A matches, the last coming against Durha in the 1972 Gillette Cup.  In his 2 List A matches, he scored 24 runs at a batting average of 8.00, with a high score of 13.  With the ball, he bowled 30 wicket-less overs.  Banton captained Oxfordshire from 1962 to 1967.

Banton's professional career was as a school teacher.  He was headteacher at Temple Cowley Secondary School in Oxford, a position he held from the age of 36, until his retirement 21 years later in 1988.  Outside of cricket, he was an able golfer, table tennis player and lawn bowls player.  Living his final years at Kirtlington, Oxfordshire, he died on 23 June 2010.

References

External links
Dennis Banton at ESPNcricinfo
Dennis Banton at CricketArchive

1930 births
2010 deaths
Cricketers from Nottingham
English cricketers
Oxfordshire cricketers
Oxfordshire cricket captains
Schoolteachers from Nottinghamshire